The Platino Award for Best Actress in a Miniseries or TV series (Spanish: Mejor Interpretación Femenina en Miniserie o Teleserie) is one of the Platino Awards, Ibero-America's film awards presented annually by the Entidad de Gestión de Derechos de los Productores Audiovisuales (EGEDA) and the Federación Iberoamericana de Productores Cinematográficos y Audiovisuales (FIPCA). 

The category was first awarded in 2018 at the 5th Platino Awards with Spanish actress Blanca Suárez being the first recipient of the award for her role as Lidia Aguilar Dávila in Cable Girls. Cecilia Suárez is the only actress who has received the award for han once winning two years in a row for The House of Flowers. Suárez is also the most nominated actress in the category with three nominations followed by Inma Cuesta and Candela Peña with two each.

In the list below the winner of the award for each year is shown first, followed by the other nominees.

Winners and nominees

2010s

2020s

See also
 Latin American television awards

References

External links
Official site

Platino Awards
Television awards for Best Actress